Otophryne is a small genus of microhylid frogs from northern South America. They are sometimes known as the pancake frogs.

Description
Adult Otophryne are diurnally active leaf mimics. They tend to walk rather than jump. Tadpoles burrow into the sandy bottom of shallow streams. They are extremely specialized with minute, dagger-like, keratinized teeth, and a long spiracular tube on the left hand side of its body. It is suggested that the tadpole is a suspension feeder, using the spiracular tube extending to the bottom surface to create a current through its oral cavity, using its teeth to prevent sand from entering its mouth.

Species
Genus Otophryne has three species:

References

 
Frogs of South America
Amphibian genera
Microhylidae
Taxa named by George Albert Boulenger